Kenneth Elsworth Calvert (October 10, 1928 – September 27, 2020) was an American politician of the Republican Party. He served in the Virginia House of Delegates after his election in 1981 alongside Charles R. Hawkins and William A. Beeton Jr. After judicially-mandated redrawing of the state's multi-member House districts, he ran in the new 20th district, where he served until being defeated for reelection by Whitt Clement in 1987.

References

External links
 

1928 births
2020 deaths
Republican Party members of the Virginia House of Delegates
Virginia Tech alumni
People from Danville, Virginia